Louise Archer Elementary School is an elementary school in Vienna, Virginia, United States, and is part of Fairfax County Public Schools. It was founded in 1867 as a school for African-American children. It is designated by Fairfax County as an elementary school center for advanced academic programs.

History
The school was originally established in 1867 as Vienna Colored School, a school for African-American children. The school moved to its current location, then a black neighborhood, in 1939. Mrs. Louise Archer served as the school's principal and taught students with two other teachers. She taught and fed all of the students. In the early 1940s, the only water was from the Salisbury Spring a mile away. Boys had to go and fetch water, and Mrs. Archer fed the children meals she cooked on a pot-bellied stove. The old school building is what is now part of the northern section of the school near the cafeteria.

In 1950 the school was renamed Louise Archer Elementary School.

In the late 1960s, Duke Ellington and his trio played at the school, at the invitation of the band teacher at that time, Philmore Hall, who had once been Ellington's trumpet teacher.

AAP program
Louise Archer has a level 4 Advanced Academics Program (AAP).

Chess Club
In the 2009 school year, the Louise Archer Chess Club won seven trophies and awards. The school won 3rd place in the country in a tournament in spring 2009, and not far behind in another National Chess Competition. The school has won the Kent Gardens Cup last year and for seven years straight from 2005-2012.

WLATV 
The morning announcements and school news are transmitted on WLATV closed-circuit television that is run by select 5th and 6th grade students.

Notable attendees
 Jamie Broumas, jazz singer

See also
Fairfax County Public Schools

References

External links 
 "Description of Vienna Colored School in 1940s," YouTube (accessed 14 May 2015)
 Hobbs, Bonnie, "‘We Formed Bonds of Friendship at Archer’: Elementary school celebrates 75th anniversary," Vienna and Oakton Connection, 'March 12-18, 2014

Public elementary schools in Virginia
Schools in Fairfax County, Virginia
Historically segregated African-American schools in Virginia
Vienna, Virginia
Educational institutions established in 1939
Magnet schools in Virginia
1939 establishments in Virginia